PIK can mean:

 Payment in kind (disambiguation)
 PIK Group, the largest real estate and home-builder company in Russia
 Islamic Party of Kurdistan (PIK)
 Pantai Indah Kapuk, a community in the sub-district of Penjaringan, North Jakarta, Indonesia
 Glasgow Prestwick International Airport, IATA airport code
 Polyteknikkojen Ilmailukerho, the flying club of Helsinki University of Technology
 the series of sail and motor airplanes developed by the club, including the Eiri-Avion PIK-20
 Potsdam Institute for Climate Impact Research, a research institute in Potsdam, Germany
 Google's experimental PIK image file format that became part of JPEG XL

See also 
 Pik (disambiguation)